Gone to Earth may refer to:

 Gone to Earth (David Sylvian album), a 1986 solo album by David Sylvian 
 Gone to Earth (Barclay James Harvest album), by Barclay James Harvest
 Gone to Earth (film), a 1950 film by the British-based director-writer team of Powell and Pressburger
 Gone to Earth (novel), a novel by Mary Webb which was the basis for the 1950 film
 "Gone to Earth", a song by the American Analog Set from their 1996 album The Fun of Watching Fireworks
 "Gone to Earth", a song by Goldfrapp from their single "Black Cherry"